Command and control (C2) is a military term with several definitions.

Command and control may also refer to:

 Command and control regulation, especially relevant in environmental economics
 Command and control (management), the maintenance of authority with somewhat more distributed decision making
 Command and control (malware), in computer security
 Command Control (event), cybersecurity event 
 Command and Control (book), a 2013 book by Eric Schlosser
 Command and Control (film), a 2016 American documentary film directed by Robert Kenner
 Command and Control Research Program, within the Office of the Assistant Secretary of Defense for Networks & Information Integration (ASD (NII))
 Global Command and Control System (GCCS), the United States' armed forces DoD joint command and control (C2) system
 Nuclear command and control, the command and control of nuclear weapons